Antonio Faraò (born January 19, 1965) is an Italian jazz pianist.

Career
A native of Rome, Italy, Faraò earned a degree in 1983 from the Giuseppe Verdi Conservatory in Milan and performed in clubs as a teenager. Enja released his debut album, Black Inside, in 1999. He recorded the album with Ira Coleman and Jeff "Tain" Watts. He has worked with Bob Berg, Andre Ceccarelli, Jack DeJohnette, Manu Katche, Bireli Lagrene, Joe Lovano, and Miroslav Vitous.

Awards 
 1998 1st Prize Concours International de Piano-Jazz Martial Solal (Paris)

Discography

As leader

As sideman 
With Franco Ambrosetti
Light Breeze (Enja, 1998)
With André Ceccarelli
 West Side Story (1997) 
With Nicolas Folmer and Bob Mintzer
 Nicolas Folmer meets Bob Mintzer (2010) 
With Giovanni Tommaso
 Secondo Tempo (2001) 
With Jens Winther
 Jens Winther European Quintet (2005)
With Letizia Gambi
 Introducing Letizia Gambi (2012)

References

External links
 Antonio Faraò's website

1965 births
Living people
20th-century Italian male musicians
20th-century Italian musicians
21st-century Italian male musicians
21st-century Italian musicians
21st-century pianists
Enja Records artists
Italian jazz pianists
Italian male pianists
Male jazz musicians